Escándalo may refer to:

Film and TV
El Escándalo, The Scandal (1934 film), Mexican film
El Escándalo, The Scandal (1943 film), Spanish film
 , a 1997 TV series in Peru
Escándalo TV, a daily live Spanish-language talk show about celebrity news and gossip of interest to a Latino audience, shown on TeleFutura (now known as UniMás).
Escándalos, Spanish TV series
Escándalo de estrellas, a 1944 Mexican musical comedy film directed by Ismael Rodríguez. It stars Pedro Infante, Blanquita Amaro, and Florencio Castelló.
Escándalo de medianoche, a 1923 Argentine black and white silent film.

Music
Escândalo, Portuguese language album by Angela Ro Ro 2009 
"Escándalo", Spanish song from 1994 album by Vikki Carr  Recuerdo a Javier Solís
"Escándalo", Rubén Amado Anclado En Mi Corazón
"Escándalo", song by Marco Antonio Muñiz List of number-one hits of 1961
"Escándalo", song by Raphael 1991

Other 
 Escândalo do Mensalão
Verano de Escándalo, a major annual professional wrestling event in Mexico promoted by the Lucha Libre AAA World Wide (AAA) promotion.